The Malaysia Super League is a professional football league in Malaysia which is at the top of the Malaysian football league system. The league was formed in 2004 as a replacement for the original First Division.

Up to 2021, most managers only work for few seasons with a team. The current managers in the Super League are:

As of 29 March 2021

See also
Malaysia Super League

Malaysian Football League